Darkness with Tales To Tell (2001) is the second album by Danish power metal band Manticora.

Track listing
"...From Far Beyond" – 0:39
"The Chance of Dying in a Dream" – 5:29
"Dynasty of Fear" – 4:45
"Dragon's Mist" – 8:57
"Felice" – 6:37
"The Nightfall War" – 5:28
"The Puzzle" – 6:11
"Critical Mass" – 5:03
"Lost Souls" – 6:01
"The Twilight Shadow" – 5:26
"Shadows with Tales to Tell" – 7:03
 Bonus Tracks
"Dead End Solution (Bonus Track)" - 5:51

Personnel 

Band
Lars F. Larsen – Vocals
Kasper Gram – Bass
Flemming Schultz - Guitars
Kristian Larsen - Guitars
Mads Volf – Drums
Jeppe Eg Jensen - Keyboards

Technical Staff
Jacob Hansen - Producing, Mixing, Mastering
Lars F. Larsen - Liner Notes
Chris Kallias - Artwork & Layout
Andy Horn - Re-mastering

References

2001 albums
Manticora (band) albums
Scarlet Records albums
Albums produced by Jacob Hansen